George Pollard (March 20, 1920 – April 17, 2008) was an American portrait painter. Born in Waldo, Wisconsin, he painted portraits of famous people, such as Harry S. Truman and Muhammad Ali.

Pollard served in the United States Marine Corps during World War II. When Eleanor Roosevelt visited Australia, Pollard was ordered to paint her portrait. Mrs. Roosevelt loved it.

Pollard died of pneumonia in Kenosha, Wisconsin.

Notes

External links
Pollard Studios

1920 births
2008 deaths
People from Kenosha, Wisconsin
People from Waldo, Wisconsin
Military personnel from Wisconsin
Deaths from pneumonia in Wisconsin
Painters from Wisconsin
20th-century American painters
American male painters
United States Marine Corps personnel of World War II
20th-century American male artists